Jake Dunwoody (born 28 September 1998) is a professional footballer who plays as a midfielder for SJK.

Club career
Born in Glossop, Dunwoody joined the youth academy of Stoke City at the age of 16 from the youth academy of Manchester City. In 2016, he was sent on loan to Leek Town in the English non-leagues. He was recalled from his loan in November 2016. Before the second half of 2017/18, he was sent on loan to National League North side Curzon Ashton. He was released by Stoke at the end of the 2019–20 season.

In 2020, Dunwoody signed for Derry City.

Before the 2021 season, he signed for Finnish team HIFK.

In November 2021, Dunwoody signed for fellow Veikkausliiga side SJK.

International career
Dunwoody made 15 appearances for the Northern Ireland national under-21 football team, scoring once.

References

External links
 
 

1998 births
Living people
Association footballers from Northern Ireland
People from Glossop
Footballers from Derbyshire
Association football midfielders
Manchester City F.C. players
Stoke City F.C. players
Leek Town F.C. players
Curzon Ashton F.C. players
Derry City F.C. players
HIFK Fotboll players
Seinäjoen Jalkapallokerho players
National League (English football) players
League of Ireland players
Expatriate association footballers from Northern Ireland
Expatriate sportspeople from Northern Ireland in Finland
Expatriate footballers in Finland
English expatriate footballers